Archernis lugens is a moth in the family Crambidae. It was described by William Warren in 1896. It is found in India.

The wingspan is 24–30 mm. The forewings are of a dark mouse colour, with blackish lines. The hindwings are somewhat darker, with a blackish cell-spot and outer line as in forewings.

References

Moths described in 1896
Spilomelinae
Moths of Asia